The Faith and Freedom Coalition is a conservative political advocacy 501(c)(4) non-profit organization in the United States.

Organization

History
The organization was founded and officially incorporated on May 14, 2009, by Christian Coalition founder Ralph Reed, who described it as "a 21st century version of the Christian Coalition". Reed designed the coalition as a bridge between the Tea Party movement and evangelical voters. The organization has grown quickly with hundreds of thousands of supporters and several hundred local chapters. Reed and his organization were a major supporter of the Romney–Ryan campaign in 2012 after organizing a debate for the Republican candidates, and a state chapter was also involved in state elections in 2011.

Positions
According to its website, the coalition opposes abortion, medical marijuana (amendment 2 in Florida), and same-sex marriage, and supports limited government, lower taxes, education reform, free markets, a strong national defense, and Israel.

Conferences

Faith and Freedom Conference & Strategy Briefing
Faith and Freedom Coalition (FFC) held its first conference in September 2010 in Washington, D.C., with prominent speakers Newt Gingrich, Karl Rove, and Bob McDonnell, the governor of Virginia. Other well-known attendees included Rep. Lynn Westmoreland, Rep. Randy Forbes, and Rep. Tom Price.

The 2011 conference was also held in Washington in June with several hundred attendees. Nearly all the Republican 2012 presidential hopefuls spoke, including Gingrich, Tim Pawlenty, Mitt Romney, Michele Bachmann, Herman Cain, Jon Huntsman Jr., Rick Santorum, and Ron Paul. The Associated Press described the conference as a "tryout for candidates hoping to fill a void left by former Gov. Mike Huckabee of Arkansas, an ordained Baptist minister who won the 2008 Iowa caucus but is not running for the 2012 Republican nomination." The Los Angeles Times said Bachmann was the most enthusiastically received by the crowd. Haley Barbour and Donald Trump, both of whom considered running but decided not to do so, also spoke. Cain was the keynote speaker at the closing banquet.

In May 2012, the organization announced a Jewish outreach component. At the June 2012 conference, a Shabbat program was held, with traditional, kosher Shabbat meals and Orthodox Jewish prayer services.

Road to Majority
June 19, 2014, marked FFC's 5th annual Road to Majority policy conference in Washington, DC.  The event was attended by national grassroots activists and featured notable speakers such as Gov. Bobby Jindal, Monica Crowley, Sen. Ted Cruz, Sen. Mitch McConnell, Majority Leader Kevin McCarthy, and Mike Huckabee. Conservative activist Phyllis Schlafly received the Winston Churchill Award for Conservative Leadership for her history of conservative activism.

On June 8, 2017, President Donald Trump gave his support to the organization and vowed to protect religious liberty and expand the role of religion in politics and education. Trump's speech was praised by Frank Pavone which he said that it inspired him in his anti-abortion campaign. However, his speech and attendance to the conference was criticised by LGBT leaders along with his lack of official recognition of the Pride Month, which started in June. Vice President Mike Pence, Counselor to the President Kellyanne Conway, Speaker of the House Paul Ryan, Senate Majority Leader Mitch McConnell, Senator Ted Cruz, James Dobson, House Majority Leader Kevin McCarthy, Steve Scalise, Pat Boone and Michael Medved also attended the conference.

The COVID-19 pandemic forced FFC to move their conference out of Washington. The conference was held at the Cobb galleria in their hometown of Atlanta, Georgia, in 2020 and at the Gaylord Palms Resort & Convention Center in Kissimmee, Florida, June 17–19, 2021.

Fundraising
Faith and Freedom Coalition contracted with an outside firm, American Target Advertising, to solicit donations through direct mail. In 2015, American Target Advertising raised $4,781,850 for Faith and Freedom Coalition, of which American Target Advertising kept $3,694,853.

Faith and Freedom Coalition contracted with another outside firm, Unisource Direct LLC, to solicit donations through telephone calls. In 2015, Faith and Freedom Coalition paid Unisource Direct $167,198 to raise $33,198 for Faith and Freedom Coalition.

See also

Christian right
Christian fundamentalism
Radical right (United States)
Values Voter Summit

References

External links

Conservative organizations in the United States
American Christian political organizations
Anti-abortion organizations in the United States
Political conferences
Conventions in Georgia (U.S. state)
501(c)(4) nonprofit organizations